Nebria nudicollis is a species of ground beetle in the Nebriinae subfamily that is endemic to Algeria. The species have 2 subspecies both of which are endemic to the same country. Their scientific names are Nebria nudicollis initialis and Nebria nudicollis nudicollis.

References

nudicollis
Beetles described in 1911
Beetles of North Africa
Endemic fauna of Algeria